Çavuş, also anglicized Chaush and Chiaus (from  / , "messenger"), Arabic 'shawish, شاويش', (from Old Turkic Çabuş or Çawuş, "person who gives order, person who yells") was an Ottoman title used for two separate soldier professions, both acting as messengers although differing in levels. It was a rank below agha and kethüda (from Persian, kad-khuda, "magistrate"), in units such as the Janissaries and Sipahi, and was also a term for members of the specialized unit of çavuşān (also çavuşiyye, çavuş(an)-i divan(i)) consisting of combined cavalry and infantry serving the Imperial Council (as in Ottoman Egypt). The leaders of the council's çavuş were titled çavuşbaşı /  (or başçavuş / ). The çavuşbaşı was an assistant (or deputy) to the Grand Vizier, dealing with security matters, accompanying ambassadors visiting the Grand Vizier, and also carried out the first examination of petitions submitted to the Council, and led council meetings when the Grand Vizier was not present. The title has its origin in Uyghur use, where it was the title of ambassadors, and then entered Seljuq use for Byzantine imperial messengers, and Persian and Arabic use for various court attendants.

The word gave rise to surnames, such as Çavuş (Turkish), Çavuşoğlu (Turkish), Čaušević (Serbo-Croatian), Čaušić (Serbo-Croatian), Baščaušević (Serbo-Croatian), Çaushaj (Albanian), Ceaușu (Romanian), Ceaușescu (Romanian), Τσαούσης (Tsaousis in Greek), and others. It is also the stem of place names, such as Çavuş (in Turkey), Çavuşlu (in Turkey), Çavuşlar (in Turkey), Çavuşköy (in Turkey), Çavuşbayırı (in Turkey), Čauševac (in Bosnia), Čauševići (one village in Bosnia and one village in Serbia), Čaušev Do (in Bosnia), Čauševina (in Bosnia), Čaušlije (in Bosnia), Čaušlija (in Macedonia), Chavusy (in Belarus), Çaushi (in Albania), and others. In the past in former Yugoslavia, the word čauš was also sometimes applied to the wedding-planner.


List of çavuşbaşı

Daut Bey (fl. 1484), served Sultan Bayezid II (r. 1481–1512)
Kuyumcu Süleyman Agha, served Grand Vizier Ipşir Pasha (1653–54)
Mehmed Raşid, served Sultan Mahmud II (r. 1808–1839)
Mustafa Agha
Ahmed Agha
Selim Pasha
Zulfiqar Agha
Mohammed Haji-Ajvazade
Abdul Kerim Izet

Modern Turkish military usage
 
In the modern Turkish Armed Forces, the rank of Çavuş is equivalent of "sergeant" (and NATO OR-5 rank), and ranks above the rank of Onbaşı ("corporal"). The insignia is two inverted chevrons, in red or camouflage pattern, depending on the dress.

See also
 Tzaousios, Byzantine title
 Chaush (India), Muslim community

References

Sources

External links

Turkish titles
Turkish words and phrases
Ottoman titles
Military ranks of the Ottoman Empire
Military ranks of Turkey